Aliatypus is a genus of North American folding trapdoor spiders first described by C. P. Smith in 1908. They resemble members of Ctenizidae in morphology and behavior, but this is due to convergent evolution rather than direct relation. They are most closely related to members of Antrodiaetus, which build collar doors. It is likely that the shift from using collar doors to using trapdoors is what allowed them to survive in hot, dry conditions where their closest relatives could not.

Often found in roadside banks or ravines, they build a burrow perpendicular to the surface with a wafer-like trapdoor entrance to catch prey. Burrows are often clustered together, sometimes quite densely in more favorable positions.

They are native to the western United States, where the complex landscape creates pockets of isolated species limited to small regions. As one of the most abundant genera of trapdoor spiders in California, it is argued that their sedentary lifestyle and limited dispersal could benefit studies in the biogeography of California and the surrounding regions.

Species
 it contains fourteen species, all found in the southwestern United States:
Aliatypus aquilonius Coyle, 1974 – USA
Aliatypus californicus (Banks, 1896) – USA
Aliatypus coylei Hedin & Carlson, 2011 – USA
Aliatypus erebus Coyle, 1974 – USA
Aliatypus gnomus Coyle, 1974 – USA
Aliatypus gulosus Coyle, 1974 – USA
Aliatypus isolatus Coyle, 1974 – USA
Aliatypus janus Coyle, 1974 – USA
Aliatypus plutonis Coyle, 1974 – USA
Aliatypus roxxiae Satler & Hedin, 2013 – USA
Aliatypus starretti Satler & Hedin, 2013 – USA
Aliatypus thompsoni Coyle, 1974 – USA
Aliatypus torridus Coyle, 1974 – USA
Aliatypus trophonius Coyle, 1974 – USA

References

Further reading

Antrodiaetidae
Mygalomorphae genera
Spiders of the United States